Selene is a female given name taken from Selene (Greek Σελήνη, 'moon') in Greek mythology. Selene was an archaic lunar deity and the daughter of the Titans Hyperion and Theia. Her equivalent in ancient Roman religion and myth is Luna, Latin for "moon."

The etymology of Selene is uncertain, but if the word is of Greek origin, it is likely connected to the word selas (σέλας), meaning "brightness".

List of people
Notable people with the name include:

 Selene Luna (born 1971), American actress, comedian, burlesque performer and model
 Selene Vigil-Wilk (born 1965), American singer and musician
 Cleopatra Selene (disambiguation), multiple people

References

Given names of Greek language origin